Fleek is a surname. Notable people with the surname include:

 Charles Clinton Fleek (1947–1969), United States Army sergeant and Medal of Honor recipient
 Sherman L. Fleek (born 1951), American military historian

See also
 On fleek (disambiguation)